Tours tramway refers to tram networks of the city of Tours, in Indre-et-Loire, in the French region of Centre-Val de Loire, at different times:

 A network that functioned from 1877 to 1949.
 A new network called RBD, designed from the 1990s, which was inaugurated on 31 August 2013, and is part of Fil Bleu (literally, blue wire), the transit network of the Touraine agglomeration. It consists of a 15 km line with 29 stations.

A second line could be built in the future, by installing rails on part of existing network TCSP Bus with High Level of Service, as was the case for the first line.

First-generation tram network (1877-1949)

Municipality Tours proposed the creation of a tramway in the city in 1874. Tours had spoken to a Belgian entrepreneur, Frederick the Hault, founder of the French General Tramways Company and with that the company commissioned the first network of public transport in the city, pulled by horses on 8 July 1877.

Another operator extended the network in 1889 to Vouvray along the Loire, on 7.6 km, with trams hauled by steam locomotives.

A new company, the Tramways Company Tours was founded in 1898 to electrify and expand the urban network, which reaches 20 km in 1900. During the First World War in 1916 some sections were abandoned. Suburban lines closed in 1932 before road competition from private buses.

The tram network was seriously damaged during the Second World War, particularly during the bombing of the tramway facilities in Tours on 20 May 1944, which destroyed the depot. Facilities were repaired as much as possible and the network operated until 14 September 1949, when the last tram was replaced by buses.

Network Map

References

External links

 filbleu – official operator of the Tours tramway

Tram transport in France
Transport in Tours, France
Tours